The 2006 All-Ireland Under-21 Hurling Championship was the 43rd staging of the All-Ireland Under-21 Hurling Championship, the Gaelic Athletic Association's premier inter-county hurling tournament for players under the age of twenty-one. The championship began on 31 May 2006 and ended on 16 September 2006.

Galway were the defending champions but were defeated by Kilkenny in the All-Ireland semi-final.

On 16 September 2006, Kilkenny won the championship following a 1-11 to 0-11 defeat of Tipperary in a replay of the All-Ireland final. This was their 10th All-Ireland title overall and their first since 2004.

Tipperary's Darragh Egan was the championship's top scorer with 3-23.

Results

Leinster Under-21 Hurling Championship

Quarter-final

Semi-finals

Final

Munster Under-21 Hurling Championship

Quarter-finals

Semi-finals

 

Final

Ulster Under-21 Hurling Championship

Final

All-Ireland Under-21 Hurling Championship

Semi-finals

 

Final

Scoring statistics

Top Scorer Overall

Top Scorer In A Single Game

References

Under-21
All-Ireland Under-21 Hurling Championship